NComm is one of the most popular shareware terminal programs used on the Commodore Amiga line of computers, especially for connecting to BBS systems via a modem connected to the telephone line. The program was originally written by Daniel Bloch and further development handed over to  Torkel Lodberg. The last version v3.06 was released in 1996, a public key was released in 1998 to allow full usage.  

The program was reviewed by André Viergever at Amiga Magazine in 1992.

See also 

 Zmodem - File transfer protocol
 CU Amiga Magazine

References 

Terminal emulators
Amiga software